Harry Nelson is an American author and healthcare lawyer. He is the founder of Nelson Hardiman.

Nelson specializes in regulatory and healthcare legislation. He is also the author of a notable book on opioids, The United States of Opioids: A Prescription for Liberating a Nation in Pain.

Early life 
Born into a Jewish family, Nelson received his education from the University of Michigan School of Law where he received an artium baccalaureus (AB) in 1990. In 1992, he received his JD from the 
University of Michigan School of Law.

He is also an alumnus of Wexner Graduate Fellowship.

Career 
Harry Nelson is the founder of Nelson Hardiman LLP which is based in Los Angeles, the United States. The firm is included in national and regional rankings published by the U.S. News & World Report.

In January 2017, Nelson wrote his first book, From ObamaCare to TrumpCare: Why You Should Care, along with Rob Fuller, a former hospital executive. The editor-in-chief, Rick Weinberg, of California Business Journal, reviewed the book positively and wrote, "Harry Nelson has written the definitive book on the broken American healthcare system that is being used by legislators to learn more about how to solve the U.S.’s chronic healthcare dilemma as ObamaCare turns into TrumpCare."

In March 2018, he developed a certification program for addiction treatment facilities in conjunction with American Addiction Treatment Association.

In March 2019, he published his second book The United States of Opioids: A Prescription for Liberating a Nation in Pain. The book was reviewed by Kirkus Reviews. The foreword of the book was written by Lisa Marie Presley in which she talked about her addiction to opioids and drugs such as pain killers. Presley became addicted in 2008 and she explained ill-effects of drug abuse on her and her family.

He is also a member of the board of Project Opioid, based in Florida, the United States.

Bibliography 
 Fuller, Rob; Nelson, Harry (2017). From ObamaCare to TrumpCare: Why You Should Care
 Nelson, Harry (2019). The United States of Opioids: A Prescription for Liberating a Nation in Pain

Awards and recognition 
 The Best Lawyers in America for work in Health Care Law
 Best Lawyers in America (2010–2018)
 Southern California Super Lawyers (2010–2018)
 Martindale-Hubbell (2010–2018)

References 

21st-century American writers
Opioid epidemic
University of Michigan Law School alumni
Year of birth missing (living people)
Living people